Horst Bleeker (born 17 June 1938) is a former competition swimmer from Germany.  He represented the United Team of Germany at the 1956 Summer Olympics in the 100-metre freestyle and 4×200-metre freestyle relay and finished in fifth place in the relay.

He won three national titles: in the 100-metre (1959), 200-metre (1957) and 400-metre freestyle (1957).

References

1938 births
Living people
Swimmers at the 1956 Summer Olympics
German male freestyle swimmers
Olympic swimmers of the United Team of Germany
Sportspeople from Bremen
German male swimmers